Boyagane Army Camp is a military base located close to the town of Kurunegala in the North Western Province of Sri Lanka. It serves as the regimental headquarters of the Vijayabahu Infantry Regiment of Sri Lanka Army.

See also
Vijayabahu Infantry Regiment

References

Sri Lankan Army bases
Buildings and structures in North Western Province, Sri Lanka